

Major national parties
 Indian National Congress (INC)
 Bharatiya Janata Party (BJP)

Major Regional Parties
 Mizo National Front (MNF)
 Zoram People's Movement (ZPM)
 People’s Conference Party (PCP)

Note:
 Zoram People's Movement (ZPM) is a merged entity of Zoram Nationalist Party, Zoram Decentralisation Front, Zoram Reformation Front, Zoram Exodus Movement, and Mizoram People's Party.
 People’s Conference Party (PCP) is a merged entity of Mizoram People's Conference (MPC), and People's Representation for Identity and Status of Mizoram (PRISM).

Minor Regional Parties
 Mizoram Fourth Front
 Zoram Thar (New Mizoram)
 Mizoram Chhantu Pawl (MCP) or Save Mizoram Front
 Operation Mizoram (OPM)
 Ephraim Union (EU)
 Ephraim Israel National Convention (EINC)
 Hmar People's Convention (HPC)
 Hmar People's Convention (Democracy) (HPC-D)
 Lai People's Party (LPP)
 Paite Tribes Council (PTC)

Defunct parties
 Mizo Union - merged with Indian National Congress
 United Mizo Freedom Organisation (UMFO) - merged with Eastern Indian Tribal Union (EITU)
 Eastern Indian Tribal Union (EITU)
 Mizo National Union (MNU) - merged with Mizo People's Conference
 Mizo National Front (Democratic) (MNF(D))- merged with Indian National Congress
 Mizo National Front (Nationalist) (MNF(N))- renamed as Zoram Nationalist Party
 Citizens Common Front (CCF) - merged with Zoram Nationalist Party
 Mizo Janata Dal (MJD) - renamed as Mizo People's Conference
 Mizo People's Conference (Progressive) (MPC(P)) - merged with Mizo National Front
 Maraland Democratic Front (MDF) - merged with Bharatiya Janata Party
 Reang Democratic Party  (RDP) merged with Bharatiya Janata Party 
 Zoram Nationalist Party (ZNP) - merged into Zoram People's Movement (ZPM)
 Zoram Decentralisation Front (ZDF) - merged into Zoram People's Movement (ZPM)
 Zoram Reformation Front (ZRF) - merged into Zoram People's Movement (ZPM)
 Zoram Exodus Movement (ZEM) - merged into Zoram People's Movement (ZPM)
 Mizoram People's Party (MPP) - merged into Zoram People's Movement (ZPM)
 Mizoram People's Conference (MPC) - merged into People’s Conference Party
 People's Representation for Identity and Status of Mizoram (PRISM) - merged into People’s Conference Party

See also
Political parties in Tripura

 
Politics of Mizoram
Mizoram
Mizoram-related lists